Grandy School is a historic school building located at Grandy, Currituck County, North Carolina.  It was built in 1908, and is a tall, one-story, frame building with Late Victorian and Colonial Revival style design elements.  It has a gable roof and features a tall central bell tower.

It was listed on the National Register of Historic Places in 1998.

References

School buildings on the National Register of Historic Places in North Carolina
Victorian architecture in North Carolina
Colonial Revival architecture in North Carolina
School buildings completed in 1908
Buildings and structures in Currituck County, North Carolina
National Register of Historic Places in Currituck County, North Carolina
1908 establishments in North Carolina